The 1896 United States elections elected the 55th United States Congress. Republicans won control of the Presidency and maintained control of both houses of Congress. The election marked the end of the Third Party System and the start of the Fourth Party System, as Republicans would generally dominate politics until the 1930 elections. Political scientists such as V.O. Key, Jr. argue that this election was a realigning election, while James Reichley argues against this idea on the basis that the Republican victory in this election merely continued the party's post-Civil War dominance. The election took place in the aftermath of the Panic of 1893, and featured a fierce debate between advocates of bimetallism ("free silver") and supporters of the gold standard.

In the Presidential election, Republican former Governor William McKinley of Ohio defeated Democratic former Representative William Jennings Bryan of Nebraska. McKinley took the Republican nomination on the first ballot, while Bryan took the Democratic nomination on the fifth ballot (at age 36, he became youngest presidential nominee of a major party), defeating former Missouri Representative Richard P. Bland and several other candidates. Bryan's Cross of Gold speech, in which he advocated for "free silver," helped deliver him the Democratic nomination, and also attracted the support of the Populist Party and the Silver Republican Party. Though Bryan carried most of the South and the West, McKinley won a comfortable margin in both the electoral college and the popular vote by carrying the Northeast and the Great Lakes region.

Democrats won major gains in the House, but Republicans continued to command a large majority in the chamber. The Populists also won several seats, holding more seats in the House than any third party since the Civil War.

In the Senate, the Republicans maintained their plurality, keeping control of the same number of seats. The Democrats lost several seats, while the Silver Republicans established themselves for the first time with five seats. Republican William P. Frye won election as President pro tempore.

See also
 1896 United States presidential election
 1896 United States House of Representatives elections
 1896–97 United States Senate elections
 1896 United States gubernatorial elections

References

Further reading

 
 Beito, David T., and Linda Royster Beito. "Gold Democrats and the decline of classical liberalism, 1896–1900." The Independent Review 4.4 (2000): 555–575.
  
 Bernstein, Irving. "Samuel Gompers and Free Silver, 1896." Mississippi Valley Historical Review 29.3 (1942): 394–400. online
 Budgor, Joel, et al. "The 1896 election and congressional modernization: An appraisal of the evidence." Social Science History 5.1 (1981): 53–90.
 Bullough, William A. "The steam beer handicap: Chris Buckley and the San Francisco municipal election of 1896." California Historical Quarterly 54.3 (1975): 245–262. online
 Crow, Jeffrey J. "" Fusion, Confusion, and Negroism": Schisms among Negro Republicans in the North Carolina Election of 1896." North Carolina Historical Review 53.4 (1976): 364-384. online
  Diamond, William, "Urban and Rural Voting in 1896," American Historical Review, (1941) 46#2 pp. 281–305 in JSTOR
 Edelman, Susan Scheiber. "A Red Hot Suffrage Campaign: The Woman Suffrage Cause in California, 1896." California Supreme Court Historical Society Yearbook 2 (1995): 49+.
 Eichengreen, Barry, et al. "Populists at the polls: Economic factors in the 1896 presidential election." No. w23932. National Bureau of Economic Research (2017). online
 Ellis, Elmer. "The Silver Republicans in the Election of 1896." Mississippi Valley Historical Review 18.4 (1932): 519–534. online
 Ettinger, Brian Gary. "John Fitzpatrick and the limits of working-class politics in New Orleans, 1892-1896." Louisiana History (1985): 341–367. online
  
 
  
  Harpine, William D.  From the Front Porch to the Front Page: McKinley and Bryan in the 1896 Presidential Campaign (2006) focus on the speeches and rhetoric online
 
  
  
 
 Kunze, Joel. "Shameful Venality: The Pierce-Wallace Controversy and the election of 1896." The Palimpsest 71.1 (1990): 2–11. fraud in Iowa online
 McCormick, Richard L. "Walter Dean Burnham and “The System of 1896”." Social Science History 10.3 (1986): 245-262.
 Niswonger, Richard L. "Arkansas and the Election of 1896." Arkansas Historical Quarterly 34.1 (1975): 41–78. online
 Nussbaum, Raymond O. "'The Ring Is Smashed!': The New Orleans Municipal Election of 1896." Louisiana History 17.3 (1976): 283–297. online
 Rogin, Michael. "California Populism and the" System of 1896"." Western Political Quarterly 22.1 (1969): 179-196. online
 Stevens, S. K. "The election of 1896 in Pennsylvania." Pennsylvania History 4.2 (1937): 65–87. online
 Stonecash, Jeffrey M.; Silina, Everita. "The 1896 Realignment," American Politics Research, (Jan 2005) 33#1 pp. 3–32.
 Uzee, Philip D. "The Republican Party in the Louisiana Election of 1896." Louisiana History 2.3 (1961): 332–344. online
 Wanat, John and Karen Burke, "Estimating the Degree of Mobilization and Conversion in the 1890s: An Inquiry into the Nature of Electoral Change," American Political Science Review, (1982) 76#2 pp. 360–70 in JSTOR
  
 Williams, R. Hal. (2010) Realigning America: McKinley, Bryan, and the Remarkable Election of 1896 (UP of Kansas) 250 pp
 Wish, Harvey. "John Peter Altgeld and the Election of 1896." Journal of the Illinois State Historical Society (1937) 30#3: 353–384. online

Primary sources
  Bryan, William Jennings. The First Battle: A Story of the Campaign of 1896 (1897), speeches from 1896 campaign.
  
 This is the handbook of the Gold Democrats and strongly opposed Bryan.
  

1896 elections in the United States
1896